Catherine Noël Grand (née Worlée; 21 November 1762– 10 December 1834) was the daughter of a French colonial officer in Tranquebar, Danish India, who became the mistress and later the wife of French diplomat Charles Maurice de Talleyrand-Périgord, the first Prime Minister of France. From their marriage in 1802 until her death she was Catherine Noël Grand de Talleyrand-Périgord, Princesse de Bénévent. Madame Grand was known for her striking Nordic beauty, as well as her ingenuous public comments.

Life

Catherine Noël Worlée was born in the Danish possession of Tranquebar, to a French colonial official Peter John Werlée, Capitaine du Port, stationed at nearby Pondicherry, captured by the British earlier that year.  The family later moved to Chandernagore, where she was courted by George François Grand, a British civil servant of French-Swiss Huguenot descent stationed at Calcutta.  They were wed in Chandernagore on 10 July 1777, when Catherine was five months short of her fifteenth birthday.

The couple separated soon after her seduction by Sir Philip Francis, deputy of Warren Hastings. Francis had been apprehended on 8 December 1778 at Grand's home. Grand sued Francis for "criminal conversation" (or adultery) and received 1,500,000 sicca rupees. He banished Madame Grand who then left for London. Catherine had become a courtesan in Paris by 1783, when Vigee Le Brun painted her portrait.   Catherine served as companion to Claude Antoine de Valdec de Lessart, Francois-August Faveau de Frenilly and others. 

She fled to Britain during the French Revolution in 1792, but returned to Paris before 1797. In 1797, Mme. Grand attracted the attention of the Foreign Minister Charles Maurice de Talleyrand, with whom she lived as mistress exclusively from 1797 until 1802, when Napoleon Bonaparte pressed Talleyrand to marry her.  When Talleyrand was made Prince of Benevento in 1806, she became a Princess of Napoleon's First French Empire. From 1808, when Napoleon placed the Spanish royal family in the custody of Talleyrand, the couple gradually drifted apart, and she was believed to have a relationship with the Duke of San Carlos. Catherine was with Talleyrand when they welcomed the Russian Tsar on the fall of Napoleon in 1814. From the Congress of Vienna in 1815, Talleyrand took the much younger Duchess of Dino as his mistress and Catherine was exiled to London. He eventually gave her enough money to live well and she returned to Paris. She died there on 10 December 1834, and was buried in Montparnasse Cemetery.

References

1762 births
1834 deaths
French courtesans
People of French India
French princesses
Princesses by marriage
18th-century French people
French salon-holders
People from Mayiladuthurai district
Burials at Montparnasse Cemetery
Spouses of prime ministers of France